Sor may refer to:
 Fernando Sor (1778–1839), Spanish guitarist and composer
 Sor, Ariège, a French commune
 SOR Libchavy, a Czech bus manufacturer
 Sor, Azerbaijan, a village
 Sor, Senegal, an offshore island
 Sor River, a river in the Oromio region, Ethiopia
 Sor Mañón (also known as Sor River), any of a number of rivers in Galicia, Spain
 Sör, a word for beer in Hungary
 Sor (geomorphology), a kind of drainless depression with a salt marsh or intermittent lake in the Kazakh language

SOR may stand for:
 Shades of Rhythm, a British based rave music group
 SOR Libchavy, Czech bus manufacturer
 Sean O'Rourke, Irish broadcaster and journalist
 Southern Ontario Railway, a shortline railway in southern Ontario
 School of Rock, 2003 film starring Jack Black
 Son of Rambow, 2008 film starring Bill Milner and Will Poulter
 Sex offender registry
 Smart order routing, a rule-based mechanism for selecting the destination of trading orders
 Society of Radiographers, a UK trade union
 Starfire Optical Range
 Steam to oil ratio, the ratio of water used for steam and oil in oil production.
 Streets of Rage (series), a popular beat 'em up series developed by Sega
 Successive over-relaxation, a numerical method used to speed up convergence
 System of record, an information storage system
 Equality Act (Sexual Orientation) Regulations (UK legislation)
 Singapore Swop Offer Rate (SOR)
 Statutory Orders and Regulations